Martinsville is the name of several places:

 Martinsville, New South Wales, Australia

United States
 Martinsville, Illinois
 Martinsville, Indiana
 Martinsville, Clinton County, Indiana
 Martinsville, Mississippi
 Martinsville, Missouri
 Martinsville, New Jersey
 Martinsville, Ohio
 Martinsville, Texas
 Martinsville, Virginia
 Martinsville Speedway, a NASCAR race track near the namesake city in Virginia
 Martinsville, Wisconsin

See also
 Martinsville High School (disambiguation)
 New Martinsville, West Virginia
 Martensville, Saskatchewan, Canada
 Martinsburg (disambiguation)